Chikako Urano (Japanese: 浦野千賀子, born 20 December 1946) is a Japanese mangaka.

Life 
Urano was born in Osaka. As a teenager, she started publishing comics in the Kashi-hon market. In 1966, she published her first short story Shibō zero no hi in a commercial manga magazine, Bessatsu Margaret. She continued working for this magazine and its sister magazine Margaret. In the latter, she published her most successful series Attack No. 1 from 1968 until 1970. This volleyball manga was also adapted into an anime TV series and contributed, together with the series Sign ha V by Akira Mochizuki, to a hype around women's volleyball in Japan at the time.

Her husband was the manga artist Yuu Koto and her brother-in-law the manga artist Kei Sadayasu.

Works 

 Attack No. 1 (アタックNo.1, 1968–1970)
 Yuujou no Kaiten Receive (友情の回転レシーブ, 1968)
 Doctor Junko (ドクター・ジュン子, 1974–1976)
 Shin Attack No. 1 (新アタックNo.1, 1976–1977)

References 

1946 births
Living people
Manga artists